Xystochroma is a genus of beetles in the family Cerambycidae, containing the following species:

 Xystochroma bouvieri (Gounelle, 1911)
 Xystochroma buprestoides (Bates, 1885)
 Xystochroma chloropus (Bates, 1879)
 Xystochroma clypeatum (Schwarzer, 1923)
 Xystochroma echinatum Napp & Martins, 2005
 Xystochroma femoratum Napp & Martins, 2005
 Xystochroma gracilipes (Bates, 1879)
 Xystochroma incomptum Napp & Martins, 2005
 Xystochroma minutum (Zajciw, 1965)
 Xystochroma neglectum (Gounelle, 1911)
 Xystochroma setigerum (Schmidt, 1924)
 Xystochroma zikani (Zajciw, 1965)

References

Callichromatini